A dozen (commonly abbreviated doz or dz) is a grouping of twelve.

The dozen may be one of the earliest primitive integer groupings, perhaps because there are approximately a dozen cycles of the Moon, or months, in a cycle of the Sun, or year. Twelve is convenient because it has a maximal number of divisors among the numbers up to its double, a property only true of 1, 2, 6, 12, 60, 360, and 2520.

The use of twelve as a base number, known as the duodecimal system (also as dozenal), originated in Mesopotamia (see also sexagesimal). Counting in base-12 can easily be accomplished on one's hands by counting each finger bone with one's thumb. Using this method, one hand can count to twelve, and two hands (with the second hand as a placeholder for representing units of twelve) can count to 144. Twelve dozen (122 = 144) are known as a gross; and twelve gross (123 = 1,728, the duodecimal 1,000) are called a great gross, a term most often used when shipping or buying items in bulk. A great hundred, also known as a small gross, is 120 or ten dozen.

Dozen may also be used to express a moderately large quantity as in "several dozen" (e.g., dozens of people came to the party).

Varying by country, some products are packaged or sold by the dozen, often foodstuff (a dozen eggs).

Etymology
The English word dozen comes from the old form douzaine, a French word meaning "a group of twelve" ("Assemblage de choses de même nature au nombre de douze" (translation: A group of twelve things of the same nature), as defined in the eighth edition of the Dictionnaire de l'Académie française). This French word is a derivation from the cardinal number douze ("twelve", from Latin duodĕcim) and the collective suffix -aine (from Latin -ēna), a suffix also used to form other words with similar meanings such as quinzaine (a group of fifteen), vingtaine (a group of twenty), centaine (a group of one hundred), etc. These French words have synonymous cognates in Spanish: docena, quincena, veintena, centena, etc. English dozen, French douzaine, Catalan dotzena, Portuguese "dúzia", Persian dowjin "دوجین", Arabic durzen "درزن", Turkish "düzine", Hindi darjan "दर्जन", German Dutzend, Dutch dozijn, Italian dozzina and Polish tuzin, are also used as indefinite quantifiers to mean "about twelve" or "many" (as in "a dozen times", "dozens of people").

A confusion may arise with the Anglo-Norman dizeyne (French dixaine or dizaine) a tithing, or group of ten households — dating from the earlier English system of grouping households into tens and hundreds for the purposes of law, order and mutual surety (see Tithing). In some texts this 'dizeyne' may be rendered as 'dozen'.

Half a dozen
The phrase half a dozen usually means six (6) of something, as 6 is half of 12. The idiom "six of one, half a dozen of the other" means two options are of equal worth so choosing one is the same as choosing the other.

Baker's dozen

A baker's dozen, devil's dozen, long dozen, or long measure is 13, one more than a standard dozen. The broadest use of baker's dozen today is simply a group of thirteen objects (often baked goods). The term has meant different things over the last few centuries.

In the United Kingdom when selling certain goods, bakers were obliged to sell goods by the dozen at a specific weight or quality (or a specific average weight). During this time, bakers who sold a dozen units that failed to meet this requirement could be penalized with a fine. Therefore, to avoid risking this penalty, some bakers included an extra unit to be sure the minimum weight was met, bringing the total to 13 units or what is now commonly known as a baker's dozen.

According to the Oxford English Dictionary, the term "baker's dozen" originated in the late 16th century and is "apparently so called after the former practice among bakers of including a thirteenth loaf when selling a dozen to a retailer, the extra loaf representing the retailer's profit."

According to the 1811 Classical Dictionary of the Vulgar Tongue, by Francis Grose, "a Baker's Dozen is Thirteen; that number of rolls being allowed to the purchaser of a dozen". However, contrary to most sources, according to the anonymous 1785 version of that dictionary, which was probably also by Grose, "a Baker's Dozen is Fourteen, that number of rolls being allowed to the purchaser of a dozen".

The term has also been defined in a jocular way, as "twelve of today's and one of yesterday's."

The 13th loaf added to the dozen is called the vantage loaf.

A lesser-used regionalism is the Texas dozen, which generally consists of 15. This is typically used only in Texas and surrounding areas for such goods as flowers or baked goods, although can be applied to anything that is counted, such as photographs.

See also
Lagniappe
Fourteener (poetry)
Seed-counting machine
Dozens (game)

References

External links

 History of the term Baker's dozen The Phrase Finder

Integers
Units of amount
12 (number)